Clever may refer to:

People
Given name
 Clever Ikisikpo, Nigerian politician
 Clever Lara (born 1952), Uruguayan artist

Surname
 Charles P. Clever (1830–1874), American politician
 Edith Clever (born 1940), German actress
 Todd Clever (born 1983), American rugby union player
 Willy Clever (1905–1969), German actor and screenwriter

Other uses 
 CLEVER, a three-wheeled vehicle
 Clever, Missouri
 CLEVER project, an IBM research project
 Another word for intelligent

See also
 CleVR, application